Jimmy Coates: Killer, released as Jimmy Coates: Assassin in the United States, is a 2005 novel written by Joe Craig. The story revolves around 11-year-old Jimmy Coates and is mostly set in the fictional dictatorship of the "Neo-Democratic State of Great Britain". It is the first novel in the Jimmy Coates series.

Shortly after the UK publication, it was released in the United States under the title Jimmy Coates: Assassin. It was a finalist for the 2006 Manchester Book Award, and won the Bolton Children's Book Award 2006.

Development 

Craig became a songwriter after graduating from Cambridge University but preferred telling stories. He worked on the novel for a year and completed it in 2004. The novel was published in April 2005 by HarperCollins.

Synopsis 

Jimmy Coates lives like any other boy in the "Neo-Democratic State of Great Britain". One day while fighting with his elder sister, Georgie, he feels a strange sensation within himself and suddenly, using a fighting technique he had never known before, pins her down. Some men come to their house and talk to his parents, Ian and Helen Coates. They try to take Jimmy with them but he fights them off with surprising strength. These people use a symbol: A green vertical stripe against a black background. They take Jimmy's parents but his sister walks off.

Jimmy escapes from them but is followed by Mitchel, a 13-year-old thief and snatcher who tries to rob him. Jimmy easily defeats him and persuades him to take him to the police station. At the police station the police too try to capture Jimmy but he escapes and takes refuge in his friend Felix's house. He contacts his school teacher, Miss Bennett, who doesn't believe him. He is discovered but escapes via helicopter. He throws the pilot off the helicopter and amazingly he is able to pilot the craft. He is followed but escapes by jumping into the Thames River, discovering he can breathe under water. Next morning, he is found by his sister and her friend Eva's family but Eva's parents betray Jimmy and drug him. When he wakes up he finds that he is a genetically engineered assassin and is only 38% human. His neighbor, Dr. Higgins, was on the team who developed him. The Green Stripe is an organization working for the government also called NJ7. He also finds out that Mrs Bennett is an NJ7 agent and  his own parents are former agents.

He meets the Prime Minister Ares Hollingdale and is ordered to murder Christopher Viggo a person who supports bringing back democracy. He attempts to kill Viggo but instead joins Viggo, who plans to bring down the present government.  Viggo is a former NJ7 agent. Together they rescue Felix and Georgie.

All of them (except Yannick who is on another mission) get into the catacombs of NJ7 with Felix's help (he opens a hidden doorway while trying to get free chocolate from a vending machine). They are joined in the tunnels by Yannick. Jimmy goes to the Prime Minister and finds him along with Jimmy's parents and Miss Bennett. He knocks out Hollingdale and Bennett while Viggo steals a helicopter from the French Embassy and waits for Jimmy. Ian refuses to go with Jimmy because of his loyalty to the government but Helen comes with the group. They fly below the radar and head for France.

In the last pages we find that Mitchell is also a genetically engineered assassin and the Prime Minister decides to bring him in to kill Jimmy.

Major characters 

 Jimmy Coates: a young, genetically modified assassin and the series' protagonist.
 Helen Coates - Jimmy's mother
 Eva Doren - Georgie's friend who works in NJ7, but she is actually giving information to Jimmy about NJ7's plans.
 Georgie Coates - Jimmy's half-sister
 Felix Muzebeke - Jimmy's best friend
 Dr. Higgins - scientist who helped to create Jimmy
 Christopher Viggo - Campaigner
 NJ7 – The fictitious government agency that pursues, and designed, Jimmy Coates
 Miss Bennett - Director of NJ7
 Paduk - Ex Director of Special Security for the Neo-Democratic State of Great Britain
 Ian Coates - Jimmy's adopted father
 Ares Hollingdale - The Prime Minister of Great Britain
 Dr. Higgins - Part of the team that built Jimmy & Mitchell

Release and promotion
The novel was first released in 2005 and received mostly positive reviews. It became hugely successful after its launch.

Critical reception
The books received a variety of reviews. The Independent described it as
"Few books have the power to drag young boys away from their Xbox or Wii but I've seen the Jimmy Coates series in action – Super Mario is no match for this schoolboy assassin."

It was described by School Library Association as
"Packed full of shocks and surprises, high-octane action sequences, constant dangers and near-miss escapes from death, this is an at-a-sitting read for Bond and Rider fans everywhere. With bags of film potential..."

References

2005 British novels
British thriller novels
British young adult novels
HarperCollins books